Ngqeno ka Langa (about 1759 - 1 April 1846) was the chief of the amaMbalu clan of the Xhosa nation from 1794 until his death. Langa was the oldest son of Langa ka Phalo the founder of the amaMbalu Xhosa clan.

Xhosa people
Rulers of the Mbalu
1759 births
1846 deaths
18th-century rulers in Africa
19th-century rulers in Africa